Pulido is a Spanish  surname. Notable people with the surname include:

Alan Pulido, Mexican footballer 
Alfonso Pulido (born 1957), American Major League Baseball player
Ángel Pulido (1852–1932), Spanish physician, publicist and Liberal politician
Armando Pulido (born 1989), Mexican footballer
Bonifacio López Pulido (1774–1827), Spanish priest of the Roman Catholic Church
Brian Pulido (born 1961) creator, writer and producer of comic books and films
Bobby Pulido (born 1971), American singer, songwriter, guitarist, and actor
Bonifaci López y Pulido (1774–1827), Bishop of Urgell and Co-Prince of Andorra
Carlos Pulido (born 1971), Venezuelan Major League Baseball player
Cristian Pulido (born 1991), Colombian footballer
Daniela Pulido (born 2000), Mexican football defender 
Héctor Pulido (1942–2022), Mexican football midfielder
Francisco Gonzalez-Pulido (born 1970), Mexican architect
Guillermo Tell Villegas Pulido (1854–1949), Venezuelan lawyer, writer, journalist, and politician
Javier Pulido (born 1970), Spanish comic book artist
John Pulido (born 1981), Colombian footballer
Jorge Pulido (born 1991), Spanish footballer
Magdalena Pulido, Spanish film editor
Maki Pulido, Filipino television journalist
Manuel Farrona-Pulido (born 1993), German football midfielder 
Marcos Pulido (born 1995), Mexican Olympic canoeist
Maria Claudia Pulido, Colombian human rights lawyer
María Dolores Pulido (born 1974), Spanish long-distance runner
Mariano Pulido (1956–2013), Spanish football player
Mercedes Pulido (1938–2016), Venezuelan politician, diplomat and social psychologist
Miguel A. Pulido (born 1956), American politician and businessman
Miguel Ángel Arellano Pulido (born 1952), Mexican politician
Natalia Pulido (born 1969), Spanish swimmer
Óscar Pulido (1906–1974), Mexican actor
Pedro Puig Pulido (born 1932), Spanish chess master
Pamela Pulido (born 1987), Mexican writer and screenwriter
Rachel Pulido (born 1967), American television writer
Rita Pulido (born 1945), Spanish swimmer
Roberto Pulido (born 1950), American musician 
Rubén Pulido (born 1979), Spanish football player
Valeria Pulido (born 1990), Mexican tennis player 
William Pulido (born 1965), Colombian racing cyclist

Spanish-language surnames